In ancient Greece, a proboulos (Greek: πρόβουλος) was a commissioner or magistrate. Classical scholar Xavier Riu writes that it was a position created during the Peloponnesian War "to cope with the difficult situation of Athens at that moment of the war, and it was formed by aged and probably very respected men." A board of 10 proboulos were elected during Pelloponnesian War in 413 BC and took over some of council's functions.

Among the notable probouloi were the playwright Sophocles and the general Hagnon.

In the comedy Lysistrata, a proboulos goes on a tirade against Lysistrata after losing a long debate.

References

Ancient Greek titles